The New England Auto Racers Hall of Fame is a hall of fame for racing-related people in the New England region of the United States. NEAR was established in 1981.  The New England Auto Racers Hall of Fame was established in 1998 by the New England Antique Racers.

New England Antique Racers
The group had approximately 350-400 members and 80 antique race cars as of 2007. The group has been inducting area racers in its hall of fame since 1998.  By design, the Hall has no permanent home.  Instead, a mobile caravan of induction plaques, antique race cars and memorabilia is displayed at major auto racing shows and events in the region.

Inductees by year
2012
Mario Fiore, Moe Gherzi, Jerry Humiston, Jim Jorgensen, Joey Kourafas, Roland Lapierre Sr, Reggie Ruggiero, Irene Venditti

2011
Buddy Bardwell, Punky Caron, Louis D'Amore, Jerry Dolliver, Danny Galullo, Garuti Brothers, Vic Kangas, Val LeSieur, Skip Matczak, Dan Meservey, Russ Nutting

2010
Chuck Arnold, Archie Blackadar, Geoff Bodine, Frank Ferrara, Pete Fiandaca, Bob Garbarino, Marty Harty, Vic Miller, Mike Murphy, George Savary, Billy Simons

2009
Bob Bahre, Art Barry, Bert Brooks, Tom Curley, Bobby Dragon, John Fitch, Harold Hanaford, Rollie Lindblad, Jim McConnell, Paul Richardson, Bertha Small

2008
Dave Alkas, Dick Batchelder, Dick Berggren, Joe Brady, Howie Brown, Dave Darveau, Johnny Gammell, George Lombardo, Fred Luchesi, Pete Zanardi

2007
Bentley Warren. Jean Paul Cabana, Dave Dion, John Falconi Sr, Bob Johnson, John McCarthy, Bob Potter, John Rosati, George W. Barber, Dick Eagan, Dick Garrett

2006
Gene Angelillo, Russ Conway, Ken Smith, Robbie Crouch, Bob Libby, Phil Libby, Jim McGee, Joe Rosenfield, Fred Gaudiosi, Bob Vitari, Vic Bombaci, Dick Wolsenhulme, Louis Seymour, Johnny Kay, Harold Cummings, Red Cummings, Bill Randall

2005
Dick Armstrong, Smokey Boutwell, Don Collins, Joe Csiki, Moran Rabideau, Sonny Rabideau, Reino Tulonen

2004
Lenny Boehler, Harmon Dragon, Beaver Dragon, Dick Dixon, Billy Harman, Charlie Jarzombek, Bill Schindler, Paul Trowbridge, Paul Tremaine, Bob Blair, Fred Frame, Sammy Packard

2003
Richard Burgess, Stanley Fadden, Donald Hoenig, Booker T. Jones, Bob Judkins, Joe Sostilio, Bob Polverari, Dick Watson

2002
Nick Fonoro, John Koszela, Sonny Koszela, Don MacLaren, Dick McCabe, Ray Miller, Ken Squier, Johnny Thomson, Phil Walters, Bill Wimble

2001
Jack Arute Sr, Hully Bunn, Ralph Cusack, Don MacTavish, Fred Rosner, Don Rounds, Art Rousseau, Bobby Santos III, Chick Stockwell, Denny Zimmerman

2000
Mario Caruso, Fats Caruso, Homer Drew, Charlie Elliott, Dave Humphrey, Buddy Krebs, Don LaJoie, Chauncey Maggiacomo, Ralph Moody, Ron Narducci, George Summers

1999
Leo Cleary, Fred DeSarro, Melvin Foote, Billy Greco, Ralph Harrington, Hop Harrington, Marvin Rifchin, Anthony Venditti, Eddie West

1998
Gene Bergin, Ron Bouchard, Rene Charland, Richie Evans, Ed Flemke Sr, Ernie Gahan, Pete Hamilton, Leo Libby (Taz), Ollie Silva, Bill Slater, Carl Berghman, Bugsy Stevens, Harvey Tattersall Jr, Bill Welch

See also
Sports in New England

References

External links
Official website
Hall of Fame inductees

Auto racing museums and halls of fame
Halls of fame in Massachusetts
New England
Awards established in 1998